Bilegiin Damdinsüren (1919–1992) was a Mongolian composer, considered to be one of the greatest Mongolian composers and founder of Mongolian classical music. He was noted for composing operas which incorporated traditional folk melodies and is credited with composing the most popular Mongolian opera, The Three Sad Hills (1935).

References

Mongolian composers
1919 births
1992 deaths
Place of birth missing
20th-century classical composers
Male opera composers
Male classical composers
20th-century male musicians
People's Artists of Mongolia